Lu Junyi is a fictional character in Water Margin, one of the four great classical novels of Chinese literature. Nicknamed "Jade Qilin", he ranks second among the 36 Heavenly Spirits, the first third of the 108 Stars of Destiny. In some Chinese folk tales derived from the novel, Lu Junyi is a martial arts student of Zhou Tong, who purportedly also trained the Song dynasty general Yue Fei in archery.

Background
The novel depicts Lu Junyi as nine chi tall, having eyes that sparkle and with the looks and aura of a majestic deity. A native of Daming Prefecture (present-day Daming County, Hebei), Lu is a consummate practitioner of martial arts, especially in the use of staff and spear. His dominance in combat, impressive appearance and prestigious status as a wealthy squire earn him the nickname "Jade Qilin".

Arrest and imprisonment
Song Jiang, the acting chief of the Liangshan bandits after Chao Gai was killed in a battle, remembers he has heard about Lu Junyi, a widely-acclaimed fighter, when a monk engaged to pray for Chao mentions Lu's name. Song wants to recruit Lu to boost the strength of his band. Wu Yong devises a plan to lure Lu to Liangshan. Disguised as a fortune teller, Wu goes to Daming, where he attracts Lu's attention by creating a commotion outside his house. Lu invites Wu in and asks him to foretell his future. To his shock, Wu warns him that he would die within 100 days. When Lu asks how to avert that fate, Wu says the remedy is to leave home and travel southeast for more than 1,000 li. Before leaving, Wu writes a poem on a wall in Lu's house (see below for details), claiming this will protect him for the time being. In fact, the poem hides a message that Lu would rebel against the Song government.

Trusting Wu Yong‘s word, Lu Junyi sets out in the southeast direction for a temple in Shandong with his steward Li Gu and some servants. The group pass by Liangshan Marsh, where Lu deems it his duty as a subject of the Song empire to catch some bandits. He shows his fighting prowess when a number of Liangshan's chieftains come to block his way. But he soon discovers Liangshan is a daunting force with many tough warriors. As he flees, he loses his way among reeds along the marsh and boards a boat found there. The boatman turns out to be Li Jun. Lu lunges at Li when the latter reveals his identity. Just then Zhang Shun pops up from under water and overturns the vessel. Captured, Lu is taken to Song Jiang, who treats him with utmost respect and allays his hostility. But Lu refuses to join the stronghold. His captors nevertheless retain him for months, treating him as an honoured guest. They release Li Gu first, who is secretly told that his master has joined Liangshan, with the poem at his house as strong proof.

Finally let go by Liangshan, Lu Junyi hurries home. Near his house, he runs into Yan Qing, his other steward who has been reduced to begging on the street as he waits for his master to return. Yan tells Lu that Li Gu, who is having an affair with Lu's wife, has reported to the authorities that Lu is in cahoots with the Liangshan outlaws. Li has also expelled Yan. Not believing Yan, Lu goes home and is arrested by constables responding to alert by Li. Li thus takes over his master's properties and wife. He, however, fails to murder Lu in prison as the chief warden Cai Fu, whom he bribed, has also received money as well as threat from Liangshan. Lu is instead exiled to Shamen Island (沙門島; present-day Changdao County, Shandong). Li bribes the two escorts to finish Lu off along the way. Coming to a wood, the escorts bind Lu to a tree and are all set to kill him there. But they are shot to death by Yan Qing, who has been tailing them.

When Yan Qing is away looking for food as they rest in an inn, constables track down and re-arrest Lu, who is weak from all the torments. Grand Secretary Liang Shijie, the prefect of Daming, orders Lu be immediately executed. But Liangshan's Shi Xiu, who has come to find out the latest about Lu, storms the execution ground alone. Both end up captured. This time Liang dare not execute Lu, preferring to see how things pan out as an attack by Liangshan is imminent. A battle between Liangshan and Daming ensues, but the city proves impregnable. After some intervening events, including Song Jiang falling critically ill and recovering only with treatment by the physician An Daoquan, Wu Yong sends dozens of chieftains to sneak into Daming to inflict mayhem on the night of Lantern Festival. Lu Junyi and Shi Xiu are rescued from prison when the city is engulfed in chaos. Lu kills Li Gu and his disloyal wife in revenge and joins Liangshan.

Joining Liangshan
Lu Junyi participates in Liangshan's attack on the Zeng Family Fortress, whose martial arts instructor Shi Wengong has shot Chao Gai to death. On the night when the fortress is overrun, Lu Junyi and Yan Qing are stationed at somewhere away from the main action tasked with intercepting fleeing enemies. But Shi Wengong happens to escape by that way. Despite riding a swift steed, he is easily captured by Lu, who whacks him off the horse.

As Chao Gai's dying wish was that whoever avenged his death would succeed him, Lu Junyi by right should replace Song Jiang, who has been acting chief. Lu vehemently declines the offer. It is decided that whoever conquers first the prefecture assigned to him - Dongping for Song Jiang and Dongchang for Lu Junyi - would be made chief. Song wins the contest as Lu comes up against a tough warrior Zhang Qing at Dongchang, who hurts a number of Liangshan heroes with his stone-flinging skill. Dongchang is finally taken but Song is now the undisputed leader, who anyway is preferred by most of the Liangshan heroes. Lu is made Liangshan's second-in-command. That remains his position after the 108 Stars of Destiny came together in what is called the Grand Assembly.

Death
After the Liangshan band received amnesty from Emperor Huizong, Lu Junyi remains as Song Jiang‘s right-hand man as they fight the Liao invaders and put down rebel forces in Song territory in missions ordered by the imperial court. Lu makes great contributions in the campaigns, often leading a force separate from Song's. When the campaigns end, the emperor appoints him governor of Luzhou (廬州; around present-day Hefei, Anhui).

However, corrupt officials in the imperial court are not happy that Song Jiang is doing well. In their calculation, Lu Junyi must be removed first as he might revolt if Song is killed. They urge the emperor to summon Lu to Dongjing, where he is poisoned with a drink said to be from the monarch. Feeling pain from the poison, Lu cannot ride on horseback on his trip back to Luzhou and has to travel by boat. When he comes to Huai River at Sizhou, the poison causes him to feel dizzy and fall into the water. Not able to swim, he drowns. The authorities of Sizhou retrieve his body and give him a proper burial.

Wu Yong's poem

The poem by Wu Yong is as follows:

The first Chinese character in each of the four lines (in bold) when combined reads "lu jun yi fan", which means "Lu Junyi rebels". The lu (蘆) in the poem is a homonym of the lu (盧) in Lu Junyi's name. The poem is cited as a proof that Lu Junyi has joined the outlaws.

See also
 List of Water Margin minor characters#Lu Junyi's story for a list of supporting minor characters from Lu Junyi's story.

References
 
 
 
 
 
 
 

36 Heavenly Spirits
Fictional characters from Hebei